The Slingsby Type 51 Dart is a single seat competition glider designed in the early 1960s, initially as a 15 m span Standard Class aircraft but evolved into an Open Class, 17 m sailplane.  It was the last Slingsby sailplane to be mostly constructed of wood.

Development

The Slingsby Dart was the last of a long line of gliders and sailplanes built by Slingsby Sailplanes Ltd almost entirely from wood.  From the Slingsby Skylark 2 of 1953 onwards, the company had used Gaboon ply, thicker but less dense than the traditional birch for surfacing wings and fuselage, as it gave a smoother surface capable of maintaining the more demanding profiles of the newer aerofoils. The Capstan flew ten years later with double curvature parts of the fuselage skin produced from glass-reinforced plastic (G.R.P). Combined, these were the construction methods initially used for the Dart.

The Dart was originally a 15 m sailplane, aimed immediately at the 1964 UK Gliding Championships and beyond at the 1965 World Championships. Its wings were shoulder mounted, with 2o dihedral and about 0.75o forward sweep at quarter chord.  They were built around spruce spars with a plywood covered torsion box ahead to the leading edge,  fabric covered behind and with plywood covered ailerons. The mid-chord airbrakes were arranged as pairs above and below the wings.

The fuselage seemed notably long and slender at the time, and the tail unit small. It was a semi-monocoque spruce structure, plywood covered apart from the G.R.P in the cockpit area, with the single piece canopy hinged on the starboard side.  The original tail unit was again a spruce structure with G.R.P. leading edges, its all moving tailplane mounted low on the fin, though later aircraft used a metal framed tailplane. The rudder and the rear part of the tailplane were fabric covered, the latter carrying trim tabs. On early aircraft the undercarriage was a non-retractable single wheel placed under the leading edge of the wing, plus a short skid under the nose and a tail bumper.

The Dart first flew on 26 November 1963.  Four were entered into the National Gliding Competition in May 1964, but failed to impress in the light conditions of the first few days.  It became increasingly clear that the speed of the Dart could not compensate in typical English conditions for the high minimum sink rate resulting from its high wing loading of 5.6 lb/sq ft (27.3 kg/m2).  Since the 1965 World Championships were also scheduled for the UK, Slingsby decided to increase the wing area by stretching the span to 17 m, making the Dart an entrant for the Open Class.  Initially this version also had a wooden wing spar, but some distortion noticed when the airbrakes were extended led to a redesigned spar of mixed metal and wood construction. The new wing was also fitted with a trailing edge root extension and a 1 ft (0.305 m) increase in aileron length and this version of the Dart became known as the Dart 17. The first Dart 17 used an undercarriage with a less extended wheel, fitted in a fairing but almost all later ones were fitted with a retracting undercarriage.  The later Dart 15s used a similar metal and wood spar and had the root fillet, producing a net weight saving of 45 lb (21 kg) and a corresponding improvement in sink rate.  Most Dart 15s retained the fixed wheel undercarriage to allow them to compete as Standard Class.  Darts with retractable gear are known as the 17R.

Operational history

The 1965  World Championships saw only modest success for the Darts: a Dart 15 finished 5th in the Standard Class event and the Dart 17 came 7th in the Open Class.  82 complete Darts of both spans are known to have been built.  Overall, rather more of the large-span Darts were made.  One had removable wing tips, so it could fly in either class.   Two special Dart 15s, designated Dart 15W were produced for the Standard Class at the 1968 World Championships with wings using a new aerofoil section and a revised canopy.  After the competition, in which they were not highly placed, their wings were extended to 17 m and they were redesignated Dart 17W; later fitted with the retractable undercarriage, they became 17WRs.  Several Darts were built from kits in New Zealand and flew there.  Others were exported to Burma, Canada, Rhodesia,  Switzerland and the USA.

Survivors

The first Dart, now G-DBSA is now in the historic gliding collection at Lasham.  The two 17WRs, registered G-DCAZ and G-DCBA  have restricted certificates of airworthiness valid into 2015. Many others are still flying, mostly in the UK but with a few in the rest of Europe and in the USA.

Aircraft on display

Burma
On display
UB0001 at the Defence Services Museum, Naypyitaw.

Variants
From 

Dartthe first 15 aircraft initially carried no further description; 15 m span wings, wooden sparred 
Dart 15later 15 m span wings, all or most metal sparred and with root fillets
Dart 15RDart 15 with retractable undercarriage
Dart 15W new wing, designed for 1968 World Championships, 2 only
Dart 1717 m span wing, metal sparred and with root fillets  first flew November 1964
Dart 17RDart 17 with retractable undercarriage
Dart 17Wthe 15Ws converted to 17 m span
Dart 17WRthe 17Ws with retractable undercarriage
Chard Osprey
Experimental high-performance design, a Dart 15 fuselage and tail unit fitted with a wing designed by K. Chard.

Specifications (Dart 17)

References

Citations

Bibliography

External links
 Detailed cutaway
 Video showing building and flying the Dart

1960s British sailplanes
Dart
Aircraft first flown in 1963
High-wing aircraft